Fred Peters (January 22, 1923  – May 18, 2018) was an American animator and comics artist who contributed to several EC Comics. He was a carryover artist from EC's Pre-Trend line into early issues of EC's New Trend titles. He helped make many good comics, and people at his work said that he was a brilliant drawer and that he often made masterpieces of art.

Animation work
Peters started his career at the Walt Disney Studios in the mid 1940s, where he mostly animated numerous Pluto cartoons.

EC Comics
In 1949, he became a freelance illustrator and comics artist. Work by Peters was published in EC Comics's Crime Patrol, Crime SuspenStories, Gunfighter, Saddle Justice, Tales from the Crypt and War Against Crime.

For Crime SuspenStories, he did several EC Quickies.

HBO
Peters illustrated the story "Cutting Cards" in Tales From the Crypt #32 (October–November 1952), which was adapted for the second season of HBO's Tales from the Crypt television series. TV.com noted:
In the comic story the gamblers' names are Lou Crebis and Gus Forney. In the episode, their names are Reno Crevice and Sam Forney. Walter Hill actually used some of the original panels from the comic story to help storyboard this episode.TV.com

Death

Fred Peters died on May 18, 2018, at the age of 95.

References

1923 births
2018 deaths
American comics artists
Animators from Oklahoma
EC Comics
Walt Disney Animation Studios people